David Morris Taylor III (born December 5, 1990) is an American freestyle and graduated folkstyle wrestler who currently competes at 86 kilograms. In 2021, Taylor became the 2020 Olympic gold medalist after defeating reigning Olympic and World Champion Hassan Yazdani, a feat he repeated from the 2018 World Championship where he stormed his way to the title. He later became the 2021 World Championship runner-up, after being defeated by Yazdani. Then, at the 2022 World Championships, he avenged that loss by defeating Yazdani once again to reclaim his world title.

One of the most accomplished Nittany Lions in the history of the Pennsylvania State program, Taylor was a two-time NCAA Division I National Champion (four–time finalist), a four-time Big Ten Conference champion and a two-time Dan Hodge Trophy winner during his collegiate years.

Folkstyle career

High school 
Born in Reno, Nevada, Taylor attended Graham High School in St. Paris, Ohio. As a high schooler, Taylor became a four-time OHSAA state champion with an outstanding 180–2 record and graduated with a 4.0 GPA. He received the Dave Schultz High School Excellence Award in 2009 as the nation's top high school wrestler.

College 
During his time at the Pennsylvania State University (2009–2014), Taylor went on to become a two-time NCAA Division I National Champion (four-time finalist), a four-time Big Ten Conference champion and two-time Dan Hodge Trophy winner. After capping off a perfect freshman year, Taylor was pinned by Arizona State's Bubba Jenkins at the NCAA finals.

As a junior, he faced Kyle Dake from Cornell in the NCAA finals, who had moved up to attempt to become the third four-time NCAA champion and the first to win titles at four different weight classes in the history of the NCAA. After a back-and-forth battle, Taylor was defeated in a close 4–5 loss. As a senior, he once again had an undefeated campaign, claimed his second NCAA title, helped clinch the team title for the Nittany Lions and became the third multiple-time Dan Hodge Trophy winner in history. Taylor graduated with 134 wins and three losses, 50 pins, 42 technical falls and 29 major decisions.

Freestyle career

2010–2012 
Taylor made his freestyle debut in April 2010, when he claimed a University US National title. In 2012, he competed at the US Olympic Team Trials, where he went 3–2.

2013–2014 
In 2013, Taylor claimed runner-up honors at the US Open in April, defeating Nick Marable to reach the finals and then being downed by the defending Olympic champion Jordan Burroughs. After pinning '12 Junior World Champion Magomed Kurbanaliev from Russia at Beat the Streets, Taylor became a two-time US University National and made the US University World Team on May. At the '13 US World Team Trials Challenge of June, Taylor went 4–1 with a lone loss to four-time NCAA Division I National Kyle Dake to claim third-place. At the 2013 Summer Universiade, he claimed a bronze medal for the United States.

In 2014, last year's US Open results were repeated when Taylor fell to Jordan Burroughs, this rematch being much closer and forcing the now defending World Champion to come from behind to get the last minute comeback. After dominating the eventual '16 Olympic bronze medalist and at-the-time two-time World bronze medalist and two-time European Champion Jabrayil Hasanov at Beat the Streets, Taylor made the US World Team Trials finals, but was defeated twice in a row by Burroughs.

2015–2016 
Now able to focus on freestyle full-time after graduating from college, Taylor opened up the 2015 year with a fifth-place finish at the Yasar Dogu, where he went 3–2. He then claimed his first US Open National title in May, followed up by a technical fall over Cuba's Liván López at Beat the Streets. In his fourth attempt to make the US World Team, Taylor was once again overpowered by Kyle Dake in the challenge tournament, but he came back and claimed the third place when he beat veteran Andrew Howe. Taylor then claimed Grand Prix of Spain and Stepan Sargsyan Cup gold medals in July, before making the decision to bulk up to the 86 kilogram division on September. Taylor took fifth-place at the Golden Grand Prix of November, and seemed overpowered in his first tournament at a new weight class. On December, Taylor competed at the US Senior Nationals, and after running through '14 US World Team member and teammate Ed Ruth, Taylor was defeated by long-time rival Kyle Dake.

In 2016, Taylor was unable to make the US Olympic Team, as he was defeated by Dake for the fifth time in the senior level, forcing Taylor to battle for the bronze medal, which he comfortably earned. He then claimed his second Spain Grand Prix title on July, and competed again at the World Clubs Cup of December, where he went 3-1 and helped TMWC reach the first-place, while also defeating the accomplished Alireza Karimi.

2017 
In his first competition of the year, Taylor dominated through the Grand Prix of Paris in January, and despite being initially banned by the Government of the Islamic Republic of Iran, he went on to compete at the World Cup on February, at Iran. At the World Cup, he displayed amazing skillset when he dominantly defeated four top-level opponents in impressive fashion; '12 Olympic bronze medalist and two-time European Champion Dato Marsagishvili in the first round (8-3), that year's World Championship bronze medalist Vladislav Valiev (TF 14–4), '12 Olympic Gold medalist Sharif Sharifov (TF 12–2) and '16 Olympic Gold medalist Hassan Yazdani (fall).

After a prestigious last performance, Taylor came back to claim his second US National title on April, with an overall score of 40–4 against five opponents. After a quick win at Beat the Streets, Taylor made the World Team Trials finals when he ran through '16 US OTT Greco-Roman champion Joe Rau and '12 Junior World Championship runner-up Pat Downey, and defeated three-time NCAA Division I All-American Nick Heflin to make the best-of-three, where he faced returning Olympic Bronze medalist J'den Cox. In the first match, Taylor rallied comfortably with a 9–3 win, but was closely defeated in the second match 3–4, leading up to a controversial third bout due to Cox' sweat and alleged passivity, which caused Taylor to kick the challenge cube and his cornerman Cael Sanderson to throw items at the official and a chair onto the mat after losing 3–5.

He came back to competition at the World Clubs Cup on December, where he helped the TMWC reach second place with notable victories over Alireza Karimi and Pawan Kumar.

2018 
To start off the year, Taylor became only the twelfth American to claim a gold medal at the Ivan Yarygin Golden Grand Prix, considered to be the toughest open tournament in the world. He opened up with a win over two-time (and defending) Pan American champion Yurieski Torreblanca, followed up by Selim Yaşar on points and a fall over '17 Junior World Champion Artur Naifonov to make the finals. In the finals, he got another fall, now over Fatih Erdin, to claim the Gold medal. On April, he claimed his second and back-to-back World Cup championship, recording four technical falls to help secure the gold medal for the United States. He also clinched his third US National title, with four victories over fellow Americans.

On May, he claimed his first Pan American title, with notable wins over Yurieski Torreblanca, Pool Ambrocio and Eduardo Gajardo. On his seventh attempt to make the US World/Olympic Team, Taylor finally and dominantly was able to punch tickets to the World Championships, when he defeated '18 Bill Farrell Memorial medalist Nick Reenan twice via technical fall on May, at Final X: State College. He then warmed up at the Yasar Dogu of July, with four dominant pins over foreigners.

At the World Championships, Taylor had a tough start, as he faced his biggest threat of the tournament in the first round, '16 Olympic Gold medalist and defending World champion Hassan Yazdani from Iran. After being down two points to six at the end of the first period, Taylor was able to overcome adversity and put on nine points on his side, finishing the legendary match 11–6. In the next round, he tech'd '18 Alexander Medved champion Hajy Rajabau from Belarus, to advance to the quarterfinals. Next, he picked apart the accomplished Cuban Yurieski Torreblanca, to pick up an 8–0 victory. In the semifinals, he had it harder, as he went to the distance against the '17 European Champion and Russia's best Dauren Kurugliev, but was able to score the comeback win 7–5. During the match, Taylor got briefly knocked out after Kurugliev accidentally wheel kicked him on the chin when escaping a single leg attempt by Taylor. In the finals, he dismantled Fatih Erdin from Turkey, overwhelming his opposition with 12 points to two, to claim the World Championship and help Team USA reach third place.

After the year was over, Taylor was named the UWW International Freestyle wrestler of the Year, and was awarded the John Smith Award winner as USA's Freestyle wrestler of the Year.

2019–2020 
After time off competition, the returning World Champion came back in April 2019, when he claimed his second straight Pan American title, tournament in where he scored 34 points to none against his four opponents and Team USA claimed all ten medals in freestyle. On May, he competed at the annual Beat the Streets for charity, against Drew Foster, where he suffered a severe knee injury which led him to forfeit out of the match, and ultimately, forced him to stay inactive during the whole year, missing the opportunity to make his second US World Team (forfeiting it to Pat Downey instead, whom he had tech'd twice), to represent the United States at the 2019 Pan American Games or to defend his title at the World Championships.

After almost a full year of no competition, Taylor came back to wrestle in March 2020, at the Pan American Olympic Qualification Tournament. He comfortably got three wins to win the bracket and internationally qualify for the 2020 Summer Olympics. Taylor was then scheduled to compete at the US Olympic Team Trials on April 4 at State College, Pennsylvania, where he was a heavy favorite. However, the event was postponed for 2021 along with the Summer Olympics due to the COVID-19 pandemic, leaving all the qualifiers unable to compete.

Taylor was unable to compete for a couple of months due to the pandemic, but was scheduled to wrestle Pat Downey (whom he was unable to wrestle at the '19 US World Trials) on July 25, at FloWrestling: Dake vs. Chamizo. After Downey pulled out of the bout due to problems with the organization, Taylor wrestled and tech'd the accomplished Myles Martin. After more months of inactiveness, Taylor defeated two-time NCAA champion Gabe Dean by points on November 24, at the NLWC III.

2021 
To start the year, Taylor was scheduled to face his former rival and five-time World and Olympic champion (at 74 kg) Jordan Burroughs, at 86 kilos, on January 9, while headlining FloWrestling: Burroughs vs. Taylor. However, it was announced on January 8 that Taylor was unable to travel to Austin, Texas due to COVID-19 restrictions and the bout was subsequently postponed for four days later and changed its location for Lincoln, Nebraska, thus moving to a different card also named FloWrestling: Burroughs vs. Taylor. After a 4–0 lead for Taylor in the first period, Burroughs rallied late to score four points of his own, but was unable to secure the victory as Taylor had criteria, defeating Burroughs for the first time in five matches. Taylor was also scheduled to compete at the Grand Prix de France Henri Deglane on January 16, but was not able to travel due to the postponement of his match against Burroughs.

During April 2 to 3, Taylor competed at the rescheduled US Olympic Team Trials as the heavy favorite and top–seed. After cleaning out All–American Brett Pfarr in the quarterfinal round, Taylor flawlessly knocked off reigning US National champion Gabe Dean in a rematch from their match at the NLWC III, advancing to the best–of–three finals. In the finale, Taylor faced reigning U23 World Champion and Penn State legend Bo Nickal, whom he is close with as a friend and teammate at the Nittany Lion Wrestling Club. He defeated Nickal twice and did not allow him to score any points while scoring ten combined points of his own, becoming the US Olympic Team Member at 86 kilograms, and qualifying him to represent the United States at the 2020 Summer Olympics. In regards to his close relationship with Nickal, Taylor then stated:
As a result, Taylor also competed at the Pan American Continental Championships on May 30. Taylor racked up 30 points against his three opponents while not getting scored on to claim the crown and help the USA reach all 10 freestyle medals.

On August 4, Taylor competed in the first date of men's freestyle 86 kg of the 2020 Summer Olympics, where he looked dominant enough to score technical falls over all of his three opponents on his way to the finals; four-time World Championship medalist Ali Shabanau from Belarus, '20 European Championship runner-up Myles Amine from San Marino and defending World silver medalist Deepak Punia from India. On the other side of the finale awaited rival and reigning Olympic and World Champion Hassan Yazdani from Iran, Taylor meeting him in a rubber match on August 5 after downing him twice earlier in his career. Down 0–2 to a step-out and a passivity point in the second period, Taylor scored the first takedown to tie it up, though Yazdani scored another step-out to make it 2–3 on his favor, before being blasted by Taylor for two points late in the match, resulting in the stunning upset comeback win, shocking the world as the underdog going into the match. This result gained Taylor the 2020 Summer Olympic Games gold medal and extended his win-streak to 54 matches.

As an Olympic medalist, Taylor earned the right to automatically represent the United States at the 2021 World Championships without having to compete domestically to make the US World Team, and did do so in October 2–3. On the first date, Taylor once again ran through his competition, dominating the likes of World Championship runner-ups Boris Makojev and Abubakr Abakarov to cruise to the finale. A fourth match with rival and reigning World Champion Hassan Yazdani took place in the finals, but this time the Iranian came up on top for the first time, nullifying Taylor and snapping his 57-match win streak, marking the series 3–1 in favor of Taylor and the latter leaving with a silver medal.

Freestyle record 

! colspan="7"| Senior Freestyle Matches
|-
!  Res.
!  Record
!  Opponent
!  Score
!  Date
!  Event
!  Location
|-
! style=background:white colspan=7 |
|-
|Win
|141–19
|align=left| Zahid Valencia
|style="font-size:88%"|TF 10–0
|style="font-size:88%" rowspan=2|June 8, 2022
|style="font-size:88%" rowspan=2|2022 Final X NYC
|style="text-align:left;font-size:88%;" rowspan=2| New York City, New York
|-
|Win
|140–19
|align=left| Zahid Valencia
|style="font-size:88%"|4–2
|-
! style=background:white colspan=7 |
|-
|Loss
|139–19
|align=left| Hassan Yazdani
|style="font-size:88%"|2–6
|style="font-size:88%"|October 3, 2021
|style="font-size:88%" rowspan=4|2021 World Championships
|style="text-align:left;font-size:88%;" rowspan=4| Oslo, Norway
|-
|Win
|139–18
|align=left| Abubakr Abakarov
|style="font-size:88%"|Fall
|style="font-size:88%" rowspan=3|October 2, 2021
|-
|Win
|138–18
|align=left| Akhmed Aibuev
|style="font-size:88%"|Fall
|-
|Win
|137–18
|align=left| Boris Makojev
|style="font-size:88%"|TF 11–0
|-
! style=background:white colspan=7 |
|-
|Win
|136–18
|align=left| Hassan Yazdani
|style="font-size:88%"|4–3
|style="font-size:88%"|August 5, 2021
|style="font-size:88%" rowspan=4|2020 Summer Olympics
|style="text-align:left;font-size:88%;" rowspan=4|
 Tokyo, Japan
|-
|Win
|135–18
|align=left| Deepak Punia
|style="font-size:88%"|TF 10–0
|style="font-size:88%" rowspan=3|August 4, 2021
|-
|Win
|134–18
|align=left| Myles Amine
|style="font-size:88%"|TF 12–2
|-
|Win
|133–18
|align=left| Ali Shabanau
|style="font-size:88%"|TF 11–0
|-
! style=background:white colspan=7 |
|-
|Win
|132–18
|align=left| Clayton Pye
|style="font-size:88%"|TF 10–0
|style="font-size:88%" rowspan=3|May 30, 2021
|style="font-size:88%" rowspan=3|2021 Pan American Continental Championships
|style="text-align:left;font-size:88%;" rowspan=3| Guatemala City, Guatemala
|-
|Win
|131–18
|align=left| Juan Sebastián Rivera
|style="font-size:88%"|TF 10–0
|-
|Win
|130–18
|align=left| Noel Alfonso Torres
|style="font-size:88%"|TF 10–0
|-
! style=background:white colspan=7 |
|-
|Win
|129–18
|align=left| Bo Nickal
|style="font-size:88%"|6–0
|style="font-size:88%" rowspan=4|April 2–3, 2021
|style="font-size:88%" rowspan=4|2020 US Olympic Team Trials
|style="text-align:left;font-size:88%;" rowspan=4| Forth Worth, Texas
|-
|Win
|128–18
|align=left| Bo Nickal
|style="font-size:88%"|4–0
|-
|Win
|127–18
|align=left| Gabe Dean
|style="font-size:88%"|4–0
|-
|Win
|126–18
|align=left| Brett Pfarr
|style="font-size:88%"|TF 11–0
|-
|Win
|125–18
|align=left| Jordan Burroughs
|style="font-size:88%"|4–4
|style="font-size:88%"|January 13, 2021
|style="font-size:88%"|FloWrestling: Burroughs vs. Taylor
|style="text-align:left;font-size:88%;" |
 Lincoln, Nebraska
|-
|Win
|124–18
|align=left| Gabe Dean
|style="font-size:88%"|6–2
|style="font-size:88%"|November 24, 2020
|style="font-size:88%"|NLWC III
|style="text-align:left;font-size:88%;"|
 State College, Pennsylvania
|-
|Win
|123–18
|align=left| Myles Martin
|style="font-size:88%"|TF 11–0
|style="font-size:88%"|July 25, 2020
|style="font-size:88%"|FloWrestling: Dake vs. Chamizo
|style="text-align:left;font-size:88%;"|
 Austin, Texas
|-
! style=background:white colspan=7 | 
|-
|Win
|122–18
|align=left| Pool Ambrocio
|style="font-size:88%"|FF
|style="font-size:88%" rowspan=3|March 15, 2020
|style="font-size:88%" rowspan=3|2020 Pan American Olympic Qualification Tournament
|style="text-align:left;font-size:88%;" rowspan=3|
 Ottawa, Canada
|-
|Win
|121–18
|align=left| Yurieski Torreblanca
|style="font-size:88%"|8–0
|-
|Win
|120–18
|align=left| Pedro Ceballos
|style="font-size:88%"|Fall
|-
! style=background:white colspan=7 | 
|-
|Win
|119–18
|align=left| Pedro Ceballos
|style="font-size:88%"|TF 10–0
|style="font-size:88%" rowspan=4|April 19–21, 2019
|style="font-size:88%" rowspan=4|2019 Pan American Continental Championships
|style="text-align:left;font-size:88%;" rowspan=4|
 Buenos Aires, Argentina
|-
|Win
|118–18
|align=left| Lazaro Hernandez
|style="font-size:88%"|TF 10–0
|-
|Win
|117–18
|align=left| Meruzhan Nikoyan
|style="font-size:88%"|6–0
|-
|Win
|116–18
|align=left| Rashji Mackey
|style="font-size:88%"|8–0
|-
! style=background:white colspan=7 | 
|-
|Win
|115–18
|align=left| Fatih Erdin
|style="font-size:88%"|TF 12–2
|style="font-size:88%" rowspan=5|October 20–21, 2018
|style="font-size:88%" rowspan=5|2018 World Championships
|style="text-align:left;font-size:88%;" rowspan=5|
 Budapest, Hungary
|-
|Win
|114–18
|align=left| Dauren Kurugliev
|style="font-size:88%"|7–5
|-
|Win
|113–18
|align=left| Yurieski Torreblanca
|style="font-size:88%"|8–0
|-
|Win
|112–18
|align=left| Hajy Rajabau
|style="font-size:88%"|TF 10–0
|-
|Win
|111–18
|align=left| Hassan Yazdani
|style="font-size:88%"|11–6
|-
! style=background:white colspan=7 | 
|-
|Win
|110–18
|align=left| Murad Suleymanov
|style="font-size:88%"|Fall
|style="font-size:88%" rowspan=4|July 27–29, 2018
|style="font-size:88%" rowspan=4|2018 Yaşar Doğu International
|style="text-align:left;font-size:88%;" rowspan=4|
 Istanbul, Turkey
|-
|Win
|109–18
|align=left| Ahmet Bilici
|style="font-size:88%"|Fall
|-
|Win
|108–18
|align=left| Boris Makojev
|style="font-size:88%"|Fall
|-
|Win
|107–18
|align=left| Azamat Dauletbekow
|style="font-size:88%"|Fall
|-
! style=background:white colspan=7 | 
|-
|Win
|106–18
|align=left| Nick Reenan
|style="font-size:88%"|TF 12–0
|style="font-size:88%" rowspan=2|June 15–16, 2018
|style="font-size:88%" rowspan=2|2018 Final X: State College
|style="text-align:left;font-size:88%;" rowspan=2|
 State College, Pennsylvania
|-
|Win
|105–18
|align=left| Nick Reenan
|style="font-size:88%"|TF 13–2
|-
! style=background:white colspan=7 | 
|-
|Win
|104–18
|align=left| Yurieski Torreblanca
|style="font-size:88%"|3–2
|style="font-size:88%" rowspan=4|May 3–6, 2018
|style="font-size:88%" rowspan=4|2018 Pan American Continental Championships
|style="text-align:left;font-size:88%;" rowspan=4|
 Lima, Peru
|-
|Win
|103–18
|align=left| Julio Rodriguez Romero
|style="font-size:88%"|3–0
|-
|Win
|102–18
|align=left| Pool Ambrocio
|style="font-size:88%"|TF 11–0
|-
|Win
|101–18
|align=left| Eduardo Gajardo
|style="font-size:88%"|TF 12–2
|-
! style=background:white colspan=7 | 
|-
|Win
|100–18
|align=left| Richard Perry
|style="font-size:88%"|8–0
|style="font-size:88%" rowspan=5|April 24–28, 2018
|style="font-size:88%" rowspan=5|2018 US Open National Championships
|style="text-align:left;font-size:88%;" rowspan=5|
 Las Vegas, Nevada
|-
|Win
|99–18
|align=left| T.J. Dudley
|style="font-size:88%"|TF 12–2
|-
|Win
|98–18
|align=left| Noe Garcia
|style="font-size:88%"|2–0
|-
|Win
|97–18
|align=left| Austin Coburn
|style="font-size:88%"|TF 10–0
|-
|Win
|96–18
|align=left| Evan Hansen
|style="font-size:88%"|TF 10–0
|-
! style=background:white colspan=7 | 
|-
|Win
|95–18
|align=left| Aleksandr Gostiyev
|style="font-size:88%"|TF 12–2
|style="font-size:88%" rowspan=4|April 7, 2018
|style="font-size:88%" rowspan=4|2018 World Cup
|style="text-align:left;font-size:88%;" rowspan=4|
 Iowa City, Iowa
|-
|Win
|94–18
|align=left| David Khutsishvili
|style="font-size:88%"|TF 11–1
|-
|Win
|93–18
|align=left| Masao Matsusaka
|style="font-size:88%"|TF 12–2
|-
|Win
|92–18
|align=left| Pawan Kumar
|style="font-size:88%"|TF 10–0
|-
! style=background:white colspan=7 |
|-
|Win
|91–18
|align=left| Fatih Erdin
|style="font-size:88%"|Fall
|style="font-size:88%" rowspan=4|January 28, 2018
|style="font-size:88%" rowspan=4|Golden Grand Prix Ivan Yarygin 2018
|style="text-align:left;font-size:88%;" rowspan=4|
 Krasnoyarsk, Russia
|-
|Win
|90–18
|align=left| Artur Naifonov
|style="font-size:88%"|Fall
|-
|Win
|89–18
|align=left| Koloi Kartoev
|style="font-size:88%"|4–1
|-
|Win
|88–18
|align=left| Yurieski Torreblanca
|style="font-size:88%"|4–4
|-
! style=background:white colspan=7 | 
|-
|Win
|87–18
|align=left| Alireza Karimi
|style="font-size:88%"|3–1
|style="font-size:88%" rowspan=5|December 7–8, 2017
|style="font-size:88%" rowspan=5|2017 World Clubs Cup
|style="text-align:left;font-size:88%;" rowspan=5|
 Tehran, Iran
|-
|Win
|86–18
|align=left| Gankhuyag Ganbaatar
|style="font-size:88%"|Fall
|-
|Win
|85–18
|align=left| Petar Savakov
|style="font-size:88%"|4–0
|-
|Win
|84–18
|align=left| Pawan Kumar
|style="font-size:88%"|TF 10–0
|-
|Win
|83–18
|align=left| Alexander Moore
|style="font-size:88%"|TF 14–4
|-
! style=background:white colspan=7 | 
|-
|Loss
|82–18
|align=left| J'den Cox
|style="font-size:88%"|3–5
|style="font-size:88%" rowspan=6|June 9–10, 2017
|style="font-size:88%" rowspan=3|2017 US World Team Trials
|style="text-align:left;font-size:88%;" rowspan=6|
 Lincoln, Nebraska
|-
|Loss
|82–17
|align=left| J'den Cox
|style="font-size:88%"|3–4
|-
|Win
|82–16
|align=left| J'den Cox
|style="font-size:88%"|9–3
|-
|Win
|81–16
|align=left| Nick Heflin
|style="font-size:88%"|13–9
|style="font-size:88%" rowspan=3|2017 US World Team Trials Challenge Tournament
|-
|Win
|80–16
|align=left| Pat Downey
|style="font-size:88%"|TF 10–0
|-
|Win
|79–16
|align=left| Joe Rau
|style="font-size:88%"|TF 13–0
|-
|Win
|78–16
|align=left| Takahiro Murayama
|style="font-size:88%"|Fall
|style="font-size:88%"|May 17, 2017
|style="font-size:88%"|2017 Beat The Streets: Times Square
|style="text-align:left;font-size:88%;" |
 New York City, New York
|-
! style=background:white colspan=7 | 
|-
|Win
|77–16
|align=left| Richard Perry
|style="font-size:88%"|TF 10–0
|style="font-size:88%" rowspan=5|April 26–29, 2017
|style="font-size:88%" rowspan=5|2017 US Open National Championships
|style="text-align:left;font-size:88%;" rowspan=5|
 Las Vegas, Nevada
|-
|Win
|76–16
|align=left| Nick Heflin
|style="font-size:88%"|TF 15–4
|-
|Win
|75–16
|align=left| Pat Downey
|style="font-size:88%"|TF 10–0
|-
|Win
|74–16
|align=left| Chance McClure
|style="font-size:88%"|TF 10–0
|-
|Win
|73–16
|align=left| Anthony Cress
|style="font-size:88%"|5–0
|-
! style=background:white colspan=7 | 
|-
|Win
|72–16
|align=left| Hassan Yazdani
|style="font-size:88%"|Fall
|style="font-size:88%" rowspan=4|February 16–17, 2017
|style="font-size:88%" rowspan=4|2017 World Cup
|style="text-align:left;font-size:88%;" rowspan=4|
 Kermanshah, Iran
|-
|Win
|71–16
|align=left| Sharif Sharifov
|style="font-size:88%"|TF 12–2
|-
|Win
|70–16
|align=left| Vladislav Valiev
|style="font-size:88%"|TF 14–4
|-
|Win
|69–16
|align=left| Dato Marsagishvili
|style="font-size:88%"|8–3
|-
! style=background:white colspan=7 | 
|-
|Win
|68–16
|align=left| Richard Perry
|style="font-size:88%"|8–5
|style="font-size:88%" rowspan=4|January 28–29, 2017
|style="font-size:88%" rowspan=4|2017 International Paris Grand Prix
|style="text-align:left;font-size:88%;" rowspan=4|
 Paris, France
|-
|Win
|67–16
|align=left| Akhmed Aibuev
|style="font-size:88%"|TF 12–2
|-
|Win
|66–16
|align=left| István Veréb
|style="font-size:88%"|TF 10–0
|-
|Win
|65–16
|align=left| Mihaly Nagy
|style="font-size:88%"|TF 10–0
|-
! style=background:white colspan=7 | 
|-
|Win
|64–16
|align=left| Alireza Karimi
|style="font-size:88%"|12–6
|style="font-size:88%" rowspan=4|November 30 – December 1, 2016
|style="font-size:88%" rowspan=4|2016 World Clubs Cup
|style="text-align:left;font-size:88%;" rowspan=4|
 Kharkiv, Ukraine
|-
|Win
|63–16
|align=left| Bohdan Hrytsay
|style="font-size:88%"|TF 19–6
|-
|Loss
|62–16
|align=left| Dmytro Rochniak
|style="font-size:88%"|2–6
|-
|Win
|62–15
|align=left| Nika Kentchadze
|style="font-size:88%"|Fall
|-
! style=background:white colspan=7 | 
|-
|Win
|61–15
|align=left| István Veréb
|style="font-size:88%"|8–6
|style="font-size:88%" rowspan=4|July 9–10, 2016
|style="font-size:88%" rowspan=4|2016 Grand Prix of Spain
|style="text-align:left;font-size:88%;" rowspan=4|
 Madrid, Spain
|-
|Win
|60–15
|align=left| Orgodolyn Üitümen
|style="font-size:88%"|14–7
|-
|Win
|59–15
|align=left| Anthony Valencia
|style="font-size:88%"|10–3
|-
|Win
|58–15
|align=left| Vahid Shahmohammadiizad
|style="font-size:88%"|6–2
|-
! style=background:white colspan=7 | 
|-
|Win
|57–15
|align=left| Andrew Howe
|style="font-size:88%"|5–2
|style="font-size:88%" rowspan=3|April 8–10, 2016
|style="font-size:88%" rowspan=3|2016 US Olympic Team Trials
|style="text-align:left;font-size:88%;" rowspan=3|
 Iowa City, Iowa
|-
|Loss
|56–15
|align=left| Kyle Dake
|style="font-size:88%"|4–11
|-
|Win
|56–14
|align=left| Austin Trotman
|style="font-size:88%"|5–2
|-
! style=background:white colspan=7 | 
|-
|Loss
|55–14
|align=left| Kyle Dake
|style="font-size:88%"|4–11
|style="font-size:88%" rowspan=3|December 18–19, 2015
|style="font-size:88%" rowspan=3|2015 US Nationals – US Olympic Trials Qualifier
|style="text-align:left;font-size:88%;" rowspan=3|
 Las Vegas, Nevada
|-
|Win
|55–13
|align=left| Richard Perry
|style="font-size:88%"|TF 11–0
|-
|Win
|54–13
|align=left| Ed Ruth
|style="font-size:88%"|TF 13–0
|-
! style=background:white colspan=7 | 
|-
|Loss
|53–13
|align=left| Ehsan Lashgari
|style="font-size:88%"|TF 0–10
|style="font-size:88%" rowspan=3|November 27–29, 2015
|style="font-size:88%" rowspan=3|2015 Golden Grand Prix
|style="text-align:left;font-size:88%;" rowspan=3|
 Baku, Azerbaijan
|-
|Loss
|53–12
|align=left| Gardiiyev Nurmagomed
|style="font-size:88%"|0–6
|-
|Win
|53–11
|align=left| Umidjon Ismanov
|style="font-size:88%"|8–4
|-
! style=background:white colspan=7 | 
|-
|Win
|52–11
|align=left| Kakhaber Khubezhty
|style="font-size:88%"|TF 12–2
|style="font-size:88%" rowspan=3|July 18–19, 2015
|style="font-size:88%" rowspan=3|2015 Stepan Sargsyan Tournament
|style="text-align:left;font-size:88%;" rowspan=3|
 Yerevan, Armenia
|-
|Win
|51–11
|align=left| Giya Chikhladze
|style="font-size:88%"|Fall
|-
|Win
|50–11
|align=left| Ruslan Rubaev
|style="font-size:88%"|Fall
|-
! style=background:white colspan=7 | 
|-
|Win
|49–11
|align=left| Carmelo Lumia
|style="font-size:88%"|12–6
|style="font-size:88%" rowspan=4|July 11, 2015
|style="font-size:88%" rowspan=4|2015 Grand Prix of Spain
|style="text-align:left;font-size:88%;" rowspan=4|
 Madrid, Spain
|-
|Win
|48–11
|align=left| Zhang Chongyao
|style="font-size:88%"|9–1
|-
|Win
|47–11
|align=left| Gong Byung Min
|style="font-size:88%"|10–1
|-
|Win
|46–11
|align=left| Rafael Mota
|style="font-size:88%"|TF 13–0
|-
! style=background:white colspan=7 | 
|-
|Win
|45–11
|align=left| Andrew Howe
|style="font-size:88%"|6–0
|style="font-size:88%" rowspan=3|June 12–14, 2015
|style="font-size:88%" rowspan=3|2015 US World Team Trials Challenge
|style="text-align:left;font-size:88%;" rowspan=3|
 Madison, Wisconsin
|-
|Loss
|44–11
|align=left| Kyle Dake
|style="font-size:88%"|2–8
|-
|Win
|44–10
|align=left| Tyler Stalledwell
|style="font-size:88%"|5–2
|-
|Win
|43–10
|align=left| Liván López
|style="font-size:88%"|TF 18–7
|style="font-size:88%"|May 12, 2015
|style="font-size:88%"|2015 Beat The Streets: Salsa in the Square
|style="text-align:left;font-size:88%;" |
 New York City, New York
|-
! style=background:white colspan=7 | 
|-
|Win
|42–10
|align=left| Andre Howe
|style="font-size:88%"|2–0
|style="font-size:88%" rowspan=4|May 5–9, 2015
|style="font-size:88%" rowspan=4|2015 US Open National Championships
|style="text-align:left;font-size:88%;" rowspan=4|
 Las Vegas, Nevada
|-
|Win
|41–10
|align=left| Tyler Caldwell
|style="font-size:88%"|TF 12–2
|-
|Win
|40–10
|align=left| Nestor Tafur
|style="font-size:88%"|TF 10–0
|-
|Win
|39–10
|align=left| Jacob Butenhoff
|style="font-size:88%"|Fall
|-
! style=background:white colspan=7 | 
|-
|Loss
|38–10
|align=left| Khetag Tsabolov
|style="font-size:88%"|3–9
|style="font-size:88%" rowspan=5|March 28–29, 2015
|style="font-size:88%" rowspan=5|2015 Grand Prix Yaşar Doğu
|style="text-align:left;font-size:88%;" rowspan=5|
 Istanbul, Turkey
|-
|Loss
|38–9
|align=left| Denis Tsargush
|style="font-size:88%"|3–6
|-
|Win
|38–8
|align=left| Bahman Teymouri
|style="font-size:88%"|Fall
|-
|Win
|37–8
|align=left| Abdullah Arslan
|style="font-size:88%"|12–4
|-
|Win
|36–8
|align=left| Marad Zoidze
|style="font-size:88%"|6–5
|-
! style=background:white colspan=7 | 
|-
|Loss
|35–8
|align=left| Jordan Burroughs
|style="font-size:88%"|5–6
|style="font-size:88%" rowspan=4|May 30–31, 2014
|style="font-size:88%" rowspan=2|2014 US World Team Trials
|style="text-align:left;font-size:88%;" rowspan=4|
 Madison, Wisconsin
|-
|Loss
|35–7
|align=left| Jordan Burroughs
|style="font-size:88%"|2–6
|-
|Win
|35–6
|align=left| Andre Howe
|style="font-size:88%"|3–1
|style="font-size:88%" rowspan=2|2014 US World Team Trials Challenge Tournament
|-
|Win
|34–6
|align=left| Quinton Godley
|style="font-size:88%"|TF 10–0
|-
|Win
|33–6
|align=left| Jabrayil Hasanov
|style="font-size:88%"|6–0
|style="font-size:88%"|May 7, 2014
|style="font-size:88%"|2014 Beat The Streets: USA vs. The World
|style="text-align:left;font-size:88%;" |
 New York City, New York
|-
! style=background:white colspan=7 | 
|-
|Loss
|32–6
|align=left| Jordan Burroughs
|style="font-size:88%"|6–7
|style="font-size:88%" rowspan=4|April 16–19, 2014
|style="font-size:88%" rowspan=4|2014 US Open National Championships
|style="text-align:left;font-size:88%;" rowspan=4|
 Las Vegas, Nevada
|-
|Win
|32–5
|align=left| Tyler Caldwell
|style="font-size:88%"|6–0
|-
|Win
|31–5
|align=left| Paul Rademacher
|style="font-size:88%"|Fall
|-
|Win
|30–5
|align=left| Marcus Bausaman
|style="font-size:88%"|TF 13–0
|-
! style=background:white colspan=7 | 
|-
|Win
|29–5
|align=left| Gombodorj Dorjvaanchig
|style="font-size:88%"|10–3
|style="font-size:88%" rowspan=5|July 11–16, 2013
|style="font-size:88%" rowspan=5|2013 Summer Universiade
|style="text-align:left;font-size:88%;" rowspan=5|
 Kazan, Russia
|-
|Win
|28–5
|align=left| Reza Afzali Paemami
|style="font-size:88%"|7–5
|-
|Loss
|27–5
|align=left| Denis Tsargush
|style="font-size:88%"|4–7
|-
|Win
|27–4
|align=left| Apostolos Taskoudis
|style="font-size:88%"|Fall
|-
|Win
|26–4
|align=left| Zurab Erbotsonashvili
|style="font-size:88%"|8–4
|-
! style=background:white colspan=7 | 
|-
|Win
|25–4
|align=left| Andrew Howe
|style="font-size:88%"|TF 9-–
|style="font-size:88%" rowspan=5|June 20–22, 2013
|style="font-size:88%" rowspan=5|2013 US World Team Trials Challenge
|style="text-align:left;font-size:88%;" rowspan=5|
 Stillwater, Oklahoma
|-
|Win
|24–4
|align=left| Trent Paulson
|style="font-size:88%"|4–0
|-
|Win
|23–4
|align=left| Ryan Morningstar
|style="font-size:88%"|4–2
|-
|Loss
|22–4
|align=left| Kyle Dake
|style="font-size:88%"|4–7
|-
|Win
|22–3
|align=left| Moza Fay
|style="font-size:88%"|TF 9–1
|-
! style=background:white colspan=7 | 
|-
|Win
|21–3
|align=left| Quinton Godley
|style="font-size:88%"|Fall
|style="font-size:88%" rowspan=8|May 24–26, 2013
|style="font-size:88%" rowspan=8|2013 US University National Championships
|style="text-align:left;font-size:88%;" rowspan=8|
 Akron, Ohio
|-
|Win
|20–3
|align=left| Quinton Godley
|style="font-size:88%"|3–0
|-
|Win
|19–3
|align=left| Ian Miller
|style="font-size:88%"|TF 14–4
|-
|Win
|18–3
|align=left| Logan Molina
|style="font-size:88%"|Fall
|-
|Win
|17–3
|align=left| Geno Morelli
|style="font-size:88%"|TF 13–3
|-
|Win
|16–3
|align=left| Jesse Stafford
|style="font-size:88%"|Fall
|-
|Win
|15–3
|align=left| Robert Schlitt
|style="font-size:88%"|TF 10–0
|-
|Win
|14–3
|align=left| Santonio Cathery
|style="font-size:88%"|TF 11–0
|-
|Win
|13–3
|align=left| Magomed Kurbanaliev
|style="font-size:88%"|Fall
|style="font-size:88%"|May 15, 2013
|style="font-size:88%"|2013 Beat The Streets: Rumble on the Rails
|style="text-align:left;font-size:88%;" |
 New York City, New York
|-
! style=background:white colspan=7 | 
|-
|Loss
|12–3
|align=left| Jordan Burroughs
|style="font-size:88%"|1–3, 0–1
|style="font-size:88%" rowspan=4|April 17–20, 2013
|style="font-size:88%" rowspan=4|2013 US Open National Championships
|style="text-align:left;font-size:88%;" rowspan=4|
 Las Vegas, Nevada
|-
|Win
|12–2
|align=left| Nick Marable
|style="font-size:88%"|2–0, 4–0
|-
|Win
|11–2
|align=left| Ryan Morningstar
|style="font-size:88%"|1–0, 1–0
|-
|Win
|10–2
|align=left| Holden Packard
|style="font-size:88%"|TF 9–0, 7–0
|-
! style=background:white colspan=7 | 
|-
|Loss
|9–2
|align=left| Kyle Dake
|style="font-size:88%"|Fall
|style="font-size:88%" rowspan=5|April 21, 2012
|style="font-size:88%" rowspan=5|2012 US Olympic Team Trials
|style="text-align:left;font-size:88%;" rowspan=5|
 Iowa City, Iowa
|-
|Win
|9–1
|align=left| Colt Sponseller
|style="font-size:88%"|2–0, 1–1, 4–2
|-
|Win
|8–1
|align=left| Mike Poeta
|style="font-size:88%"|4–3, 3–1
|-
|Loss
|7–1
|align=left| Andrew Howe
|style="font-size:88%"|0–1, 0–5
|-
|Win
|7–0
|align=left| Moza Fay
|style="font-size:88%"|0–4, 5–3, 3–1
|-
! style=background:white colspan=7 | 
|-
|Win
|6–0
|align=left| Matt Lester
|style="font-size:88%"|3–0, 5–1
|style="font-size:88%" rowspan=6|April 8–11, 2010
|style="font-size:88%" rowspan=6|2010 US University National Championships
|style="text-align:left;font-size:88%;" rowspan=6|
 Akron, Ohio
|-
|Win
|5–0
|align=left| Dean Pavlou
|style="font-size:88%"|TF 7–0, 6–0
|-
|Win
|4–0
|align=left| Seth Vernon
|style="font-size:88%"|1–0, 4–3
|-
|Win
|3–0
|align=left| Matt Ballweg
|style="font-size:88%"|2–1, 1–1, 3–1
|-
|Win
|2–0
|align=left| Timmy Boone
|style="font-size:88%"|2–2, 3–0, 8–2
|-
|Win
|1–0
|align=left| Nathan Millman
|style="font-size:88%"|TF 7–0, 6–0
|-

NCAA record 

! colspan="8"| NCAA Championships Matches
|-
!  Res.
!  Record
!  Opponent
!  Score
!  Date
!  Event
|-
! style=background:white colspan=6 |2014 NCAA Championships  at 165 lbs
|-
|Win
|18-2
|align=left|Tyler Caldwell
|style="font-size:88%"|6-0
|style="font-size:88%" rowspan=5|March 20–22, 2014
|style="font-size:88%" rowspan=5|2014 NCAA Division I Wrestling Championships
|-
|Win
|17-2
|align=left|Steve Monk
|style="font-size:88%"|MD 13-5
|-
|Win
|16-2
|align=left|Michael Moreno
|style="font-size:88%"|Fall
|-
|Win
|15-2
|align=left|Jim Wilson
|style="font-size:88%"|Fall
|-
|Win
|14-2
|align=left|Joe Brewster
|style="font-size:88%"|Fall
|-
! style=background:white colspan=6 |2013 NCAA Championships  at 165 lbs
|-
|Loss
|13-2
|align=left|Kyle Dake
|style="font-size:88%"|4-5
|style="font-size:88%" rowspan=5|March 21–23, 2013
|style="font-size:88%" rowspan=5|2013 NCAA Division I Wrestling Championships
|-
|Win
|13-1
|align=left|Peter Yates
|style="font-size:88%"|Fall
|-
|Win
|12-1
|align=left|Conrad Polz
|style="font-size:88%"|Fall
|-
|Win
|11-1
|align=left|Zachary Strickland
|style="font-size:88%"|Fall
|-
|Win
|10-1
|align=left|John Staudenmayer
|style="font-size:88%"|Fall
|-
! style=background:white colspan=6 |2012 NCAA Championships  at 165 lbs
|-
|Win
|9-1
|align=left|Brandon Hatchett
|style="font-size:88%"|TF 22-7
|style="font-size:88%" rowspan=5|March 15–17, 2012
|style="font-size:88%" rowspan=5|2012 NCAA Division I Wrestling Championships
|-
|Win
|8-1
|align=left|Bekzod Abdurakhmonov
|style="font-size:88%"|Fall
|-
|Win
|7-1
|align=left|Robert Kokesh
|style="font-size:88%"|Fall
|-
|Win
|6-1
|align=left|Brandon Wright
|style="font-size:88%"|Fall
|-
|Win
|5-1
|align=left|Corey Lear
|style="font-size:88%"|Fall
|-
! style=background:white colspan=6 |2011 NCAA Championships  at 157 lbs
|-
|Loss
|4-1
|align=left|Bubba Jenkins
|style="font-size:88%"|Fall
|style="font-size:88%" rowspan=5|March 17–20, 2011
|style="font-size:88%" rowspan=5|2011 NCAA Division I Wrestling Championships
|-
|Win
|4-0
|align=left|Steven Fittery
|style="font-size:88%"|7-1
|-
|Win
|3-0
|align=left|Derek St. John
|style="font-size:88%"|6-3
|-
|Win
|2-0
|align=left|David Bonin
|style="font-size:88%"|TF 20-5
|-
|Win
|1-0
|align=left|Neil Erisman
|style="font-size:88%"|MD 13-2
|-

Awards and honors
2021
 Olympic games
 Pan American Championships

2019
 Pan American Championships
2018
UWW Best Wrestler of the Year
John Smith Award as the Freestyle Wrestler of the Year
 World Wrestling Championships
 World Cup Championships
 Pan American Championships
 Ivan Yarygin Grand Prix
 Yasar Dogu
2017
 World Cup Championships
 Grand Prix of Paris
2016
 Grand Prix of Spain
2015
 Stepan Sargsyan Tournament
 Grand Prix of Spain
2014
Dan Hodge Trophy winner
NCAA Division I Championships Outstanding Wrestler
 NCAA Division I
 Big Ten Conference
2013
 World University Games
 NCAA Division I
 Big Ten Conference
2012
Dan Hodge Trophy winner
NCAA Division I Championships Outstanding Wrestler
 NCAA Division I
 Big Ten Conference
2011
 NCAA Division I
 Big Ten Conference

Endorsements 
In 2015, Taylor and Adidas released a line of wrestling apparel labeled "M2" after Taylor's college nickname "Magic Man". Taylor received the nickname after a collegiate match in which he turned an unfavorable situation for himself into an advantage. The apparel line began with wrestling shoes and has since expanded to clothing, posters and Adidas sponsored events.

See also
List of Pennsylvania State University Olympians

References

American male sport wrestlers
1990 births
Living people
Universiade medalists in wrestling
Universiade bronze medalists for the United States
World Wrestling Championships medalists
Medalists at the 2013 Summer Universiade
Big Ten Athlete of the Year winners
Pan American Wrestling Championships medalists
Wrestlers at the 2020 Summer Olympics
Medalists at the 2020 Summer Olympics
Olympic gold medalists for the United States in wrestling
World Wrestling Champions
Penn State Nittany Lions wrestlers